The Association of Home Appliance Manufacturers or AHAM represents the manufacturers of household appliances and products/services associated with household appliances sold in the United States. AHAM also develops and maintains technical standards for various appliances to provide uniform, repeatable procedures for measuring specific product characteristics and performance features.

AHAM is an ANSI accredited Standards Development Organization, and maintains several standards which are approved by ANSI through the consensus approval process. AHAM standards are also recognized by many regulatory agencies including the United States Environmental Protection Agency and the U.S. Department of Energy.  In addition to publishing standards, AHAM also provides regular information and advocacy to members before other standards development organizations such as Underwriters Laboratories, the Canadian Standards Association, ASTM, IEC and ISO.

AHAM administers voluntary certification programs to rate appliances developed by members and non-members. Testing is conducted by third-party laboratories and, upon certification, appliances may carry the AHAM seal.

Legislation
AHAM supported the EPS Service Parts Act of 2014 (H.R. 5057; 113th Congress), a bill that would exempt certain external power supplies from complying with standards set forth in a final rule published by the United States Department of Energy in February 2014. The United States House Committee on Energy and Commerce describes the bill as a bill that "provides regulatory relief by making a simple technical correction to the 2007 Energy Independence and Security Act to exempt certain power supply (EPS) service and spare parts from federal efficiency standards."

References

External links 
 AHAM website
 Information on Room Air-Conditioners
 Information on Clear Air Delivery Rate
 Information on Central Vacuum Systems

Professional associations based in the United States
Home appliance manufacturers